Niccolò di Giacomo da Bologna (c. 1325 – c. 1403), usually known as Niccolò da Bologna, was one of the most important and prolific manuscript illuminators in 14th-century Bologna. He was active from about 1349 to 1403.  He is known for his expressive figures and crowded, action-filled narrative scenes. The first signed works by Niccolò are all copies of Gratian's ‘Decretals’, one of the standard works of canon law. He and his workshop later illuminated a variety of other manuscripts, including university texts, choir books and other liturgical texts, private devotional books, and even works of secular poetry and drama. Niccolò also illuminated a number of specialty books made for various corporate groups in the city, such as statute books and guild registers.  He was a financially successful artist who was appointed illuminator to the city of Bologna in the 1380s and was an active member of city government.  He was the uncle of the artist Jacopo di Paolo (active 1371-1426).

References
Boskovits, Miklós, Richard Offner and Klara Steinwig, The Fourteenth Century: the Painters of the Miniaturist Tendency, Giunti, Florence, 1984.

External links
  ArtCyclopedia

Gallery

1325 births
14th-century births
15th-century deaths
Trecento painters
14th-century Italian painters
Italian male painters
15th-century Italian painters
Painters from Bologna
Manuscript illuminators